Shabazz may refer to:
 Tribe of Shabazz, a supposed ancient Black nation led by prophet Shabazz, according to the Nation of Islam doctrine
Shabazz (name), including a list of notable people with the name
Shabazz Palaces, hip-hop group
Shabazz, a 1975 album by jazz drummer Billy Cobham